The Men's under-23 time trial of the 2013 UCI Road World Championships took place in Tuscany, Italy on 23 September 2013.

Qualification

Final classification

Source

References

Men's under-23 time trial
UCI Road World Championships – Men's under-23 time trial
2013 in men's road cycling